The 2016 season is Balestier Khalsa's 21st consecutive season in the top flight of Singapore football and in the S.League. Along with the S.League, the club will also compete in the Prime League, the Singapore Cup and the Singapore League Cup.

Squad

S.League squad

Coaching staff

Transfer

Pre-season transfers
Source

In

Out

Mid-season transfers

In

Out

Team statistics

Appearances and goals

Numbers in parentheses denote appearances as substitute.

Competitions

S.League

Singapore Cup

Balestier Khalsa won 4–3 on aggregate.

Albirex Niigata (S) won 2-0 on aggregate.

Singapore TNP League Cup

Group B

References

Balestier Khalsa FC seasons
Singaporean football clubs 2016 season